Joshua Malik Hall is the representative for District 7 of the Connecticut House of Representatives. He was elected in a special election on April 25, 2017. He was elected on the Working Families Party line, but is a registered Democrat and joined the Democratic majority in the Connecticut House.

Early life, education and career
Hall is the former vice president of the Hartford Federation of Teachers and is a former teacher at Weaver High School.

Elections
2017 Special. Hall received 41.1% of the vote, defeating Democratic nominee Rickey Pinckney Sr. and Independent Kenneth P. Green.

External links
 Biography at Ballotpedia

References

Year of birth missing (living people)
Living people
Democratic Party members of the Connecticut House of Representatives
Working Families Party politicians
African-American state legislators in Connecticut
21st-century African-American people